"That's Where It's At" is a song written by Sam Cooke and J.W. Alexander. Recorded by Cooke, it was released as a single in September 1964.

The song was recorded in 32 takes on August 20, 1963 at the RCA studio in Los Angeles, although not released until over a year later. The backing band on the single consisted of trumpeter John Anderson, bassist Harper Cosby, trombonist John "Streamline" Ewing, drummer June Gardner, saxophonist Jewell Grant, violinist Darel Terwilliger, and guitarists René Hall and Bobby Womack.

It was not initially much of a commercial success, charting no higher than 93 on the Billboard Hot 100. By Cooke's personal standards it was similarly low, especially when compared to his previous and following singles ("Good Times" and "Shake", respectively), both of which were comfortably in the Top 20. However, the song has also garnered critical acclaim in the decades since. It is ranked 876th in American music critic Dave Marsh's 1989 list, The Heart of Rock and Soul: The 1001 Greatest Singles Ever Made.

"That's Where It's At" has been covered by such artists as Van Morrison, Ray Charles, and Bobby Womack, among others.

References

1964 singles
Sam Cooke songs
Songs written by Sam Cooke
Songs written by J. W. Alexander (musician)
RCA Records singles
1964 songs